Timothy David Rouse (born 9 April 1996) is an English cricketer who most recently played for Somerset County Cricket Club. A top order right-handed batsman, he also bowls right-arm off spin. He made his first-class debut for Cardiff MCC University against Glamorgan in April 2015. In September 2014, Rouse graduated from the Somerset academy and, along with Sam Wyatt-Haines and Ollie Sale, was granted a SCCC Scholarship for the summer.

References

External links
 

1996 births
Living people
English cricketers
Cardiff MCCU cricketers
Somerset cricketers
Cricketers from Sheffield
English cricketers of the 21st century